The Rundown is the former evening national network news broadcast of ABS-CBN News Channel in the Philippines. It is aired Monday to Friday from 8:00 p.m. to 9:00 p.m. (PST). It premiere on March 1, 2010. The show concluded on October 7, 2011. It was replaced by Primetime on ANC in its timeslot.

History

Drilon–Carandang era
It was first aired on March 1, 2010, with Ces Oreña-Drilon and Ricky Carandang as anchors. Meanwhile, business anchor Maiki Oreta and Boom Gonzales are segment anchors. However, Carandang left the newscast in June 2010, as he was appointed by Philippine President Benigno S. Aquino III as the secretary of the newly created Presidential Communications Development and Strategic Planning Office. This left Drilon as the sole anchor.

Drilon–Manotoc era
On September 20, 2010, former Mornings @ ANC anchor TJ Manotoc became Drilon's segment anchor where he gives some of the comments and feedback from Facebook and Twitter. The newscast also updated its opening billboard. During that time, Hardball host Boyet Sison became its newest segment anchor on sports and entertainment.

Drilon–Velasquez–Manotoc era
In February 2011, Tony Velasquez became Drilon's permanent co-anchor; this results in updating its opening billboard.

Anchors
 Ces Oreña-Drilon
 TJ Manotoc
 Tony Velasquez

Former anchor
 Ricky Carandang

See also
 List of programs shown on the ABS-CBN News Channel
 ABS-CBN News and Current Affairs
 ABS-CBN News Channel

References

ABS-CBN News Channel original programming
ABS-CBN news shows
English-language television shows
2010 Philippine television series debuts
2011 Philippine television series endings